The Oshkosh Northwestern is a daily newspaper based in Oshkosh, Wisconsin.

The Northwestern was owned by the Schwalm and Heaney families until 1998, when it was sold to Ogden Newspapers; Ogden traded the paper to Thomson Newspapers two months later for four papers in Ohio and Pennsylvania. It has been part of the Gannett chain of newspapers since 2000, when it was purchased from Thomson Corporation.

The Northwestern is primarily distributed in Winnebago, Waushara, and Green Lake counties.

History 
For the forty years preceding establishment of the newspaper's name as Oshkosh Northwestern in 1979, the newspaper was known as the Oshkosh Daily Northwestern.

Building
The building for the newspaper was listed on the National Register of Historic Places on May 13, 1982. It is a significant example of 1930 Renaissance architecture.

In 2017 the building was purchased by Oshkosh Business Center III LLC.

References

External links

Oshkosh Northwestern online

Newspapers published in Wisconsin
Buildings and structures in Oshkosh, Wisconsin
Gannett publications
Commercial buildings on the National Register of Historic Places in Wisconsin
National Register of Historic Places in Winnebago County, Wisconsin